Rachel Kimsey is an American actress. She holds a BFA from Brigham Young University, which she earned in 2000.

Career

Kimsey portrayed Mackenzie Browning on the soap opera The Young and the Restless beginning in March 2005 but was let go from the soap after only a year, making her last appearance on May 17, 2006. She also portrayed one of Candice Wilmer's many facades in the Season 2 episode "Kindred" of the NBC television show Heroes.

Filmography

Films

Television

Web

Music video

Video games

External links
 
 Rachel Kimsey profile

References

Living people

American soap opera actresses
American film actresses
American stunt performers
American television actresses
American video game actresses
American voice actresses
Brigham Young University alumni
Year of birth missing (living people)
20th-century American actresses
21st-century American actresses